Grenadian Creole English is a Creole language spoken in Grenada. It is a member of the Southern branch of English-based Eastern Atlantic Creoles, along with Antiguan Creole (Antigua and Barbuda), Bajan Creole (Barbados), Guyanese Creole (Guyana), Tobagonian Creole, Trinidadian Creole (Trinidad and Tobago), Vincentian Creole (Saint Vincent and the Grenadines), and Virgin Islands Creole (Virgin Islands). It is the common vernacular and the native language of nearly all inhabitants of Grenada, or approximately 89,000 native speakers in 2001.

History
The British Empire took control of Grenada from France in the 18th century, and ruled until its independence in 1974. Despite the long history of British rule, Grenada's French heritage is still evidenced by the number of French loanwords in Grenadian Creole English, as well as by the lingering existence of Grenadian Creole French in the country. The francophone character of Grenada was uninterrupted for more than a century before British rule which eventually led to Grenadian Creole English replacing Grenadian Creole French as the lingua franca of the island. 

The Grenada Creole Society, founded in 2009, implemented the mission to research and document the language in Grenada. The initial findings were published in 2012 in the publication Double Voicing and Multiplex Identities ed. Nicholas Faraclas et al.

Linguistic Features 
The syntactic structures of Grenadian Creole English is influenced by Standard English, French and some African languages.

See also
 Bermudian English
 Jamaican Patois

References

External links
 Dictionary of Grenadianisms

Languages of Grenada
English-based pidgins and creoles
English language in the Caribbean
Creoles of the Caribbean
Languages of the African diaspora